Acianthera limae is a species of orchid.

limae
Plants described in 1940